Wouter Jolie (born 7 July 1985 in Naarden) (say "Vow-ti Yo-lee") is a Dutch field hockey player.  At the 2012 Summer Olympics, he competed for the national team in the men's tournament. Jolie is a key member of the H.C. Bloemendaal squad, which won the Euro Hockey League (EHL) in 2008-09 and are the current champions, having won the 2012-13 EHL. Jolie is a defender, but scores goals remarkably often, generally off penalty corners, where he strikes the ball very effectively.

References

External links
 

1985 births
Living people
Dutch male field hockey players
Male field hockey defenders
2010 Men's Hockey World Cup players
Field hockey players at the 2012 Summer Olympics
2014 Men's Hockey World Cup players
Olympic field hockey players of the Netherlands
Olympic silver medalists for the Netherlands
Olympic medalists in field hockey
People from Naarden
Medalists at the 2012 Summer Olympics
HC Bloemendaal players
Men's Hoofdklasse Hockey players
Hockey India League players
Uttar Pradesh Wizards players
Sportspeople from North Holland
Dutch expatriate sportspeople in India
Expatriate field hockey players
20th-century Dutch people
21st-century Dutch people